Rudolf Grüttner (born 5 March 1933) is a German stamp designer and graphic designer.

The professor was rector of the Berlin Art School from 1988 to 1990 and awarded the Goethepreis of Berlin in 1988.

Biography 
After his apprenticeship as a sign painter from 1947 to 1950, Rudolf Grüttner first worked as a poster painter until 1952. He then studied commercial graphics at the Technical School for Applied Arts in Berlin. This was followed by distance learning at the Karl Marx University in Leipzig until 1959, which he finished as a technical school teacher. In this function he worked in 1959/60 at the technical school for applied arts in Berlin and then until 1966 as chief graphic designer of the magazine Freie Welt. After working freelance as a commercial artist in Berlin, he was appointed lecturer at the Kunsthochschule Berlin-Weißensee in 1975, where he also worked as a professor from 1978. After Walter Womacka left, he was rector of the Kunsthochschule Berlin-Weißensee from 1988 to 1991. His extensive work includes numerous posters, stamps, record sleeves and book covers.

External links 
 Grüttner in the Catalogue of the Deutsche Nationalbibliothek (German)

References 

Living people
1933 births
German graphic designers
German stamp designers